Cora fimbriata is a species of basidiolichen in the family Hygrophoraceae. Found in Colombia, it was formally described as a new species in 2014 by Leidy Yasmín Vargas, Bibiana Moncada, and Robert Lücking. It is only known to occur at the type locality, where it grows on tree bark in association with bryophytes in partially exposed microhabitats. The specific epithet fimbriata refers to the cilia that are fringed on the margins of the lobes. Similar species include Cora setosa and Cora casanarensis.

References

fimbriata
Lichen species
Lichens described in 2014
Lichens of Colombia
Basidiolichens
Taxa named by Robert Lücking